KDOT, K-Dot, or K.Dot may refer to:
 KDOT (FM)
 Kansas Department of Transportation
 K.Dot, former stage name of American rapper Kendrick Lamar